Eduardo Burguete (4 January 1962 – 27 February 2023) was a Spanish modern pentathlete. He competed at the 1984 Summer Olympics.

Burguete died on 27 February 2023, at the age of 61.

References

1962 births
2023 deaths
Spanish male modern pentathletes
Olympic modern pentathletes of Spain
Modern pentathletes at the 1984 Summer Olympics
Sportspeople from Valencia